A list of films produced in Argentina in 1956:

External links and references
 Argentine films of 1956 at the Internet Movie Database

1956
Argentine
Films